Steve Olfers (born 25 February 1982 in Haarlem) is a Dutch former footballer who played as a centre back.

Career
Olfers made his debut in professional football, being part of the Feyenoord squad in the 1999–2000 season. He also played for Excelsior, RKC Waalwijk, FC Den Bosch, Sparta Rotterdam and AaB before joining Gabala in August 2010.

During an interview in July 2013, Olfers stated that he was looking for a new club, preferably outside of the Netherlands.
After two-years out of the game, Olfers signed a one-year contract with Eerste Divisie side Telstar in June 2014.

Career statistics

Honours

Club
AaB
Danish Superliga (1): 2007–08

References

External links
 AaB profile
Career stats at Danmarks Radio

1982 births
Living people
Dutch footballers
Dutch sportspeople of Surinamese descent
Feyenoord players
Excelsior Rotterdam players
RKC Waalwijk players
FC Den Bosch players
Sparta Rotterdam players
AaB Fodbold players
PSV Eindhoven players
SC Telstar players
Eredivisie players
Eerste Divisie players
Danish Superliga players
Dutch expatriate footballers
Expatriate men's footballers in Denmark
Dutch expatriate sportspeople in Denmark
Association football defenders
Association football midfielders
Footballers from Haarlem
Association football utility players
Gabala FC players
Expatriate footballers in Azerbaijan